Diogo Barbosa Mendanha (17 August 1992), known as Diogo Barbosa, is a Brazilian footballer who plays for Grêmio as a left back.

Club career
Born in Terra Nova do Norte, Mato Grosso, Diogo joined Vasco da Gama in 2010, after impressing for Vila Nova's youth categories. He made his first team – and Série A – debut on 24 October 2010, starting in a 1–1 home draw against Flamengo.

On 13 September 2011, after being rarely used, Diogo was loaned to Sport until the end of the following year. In August 2012, however, he moved to ASA also in a temporary deal, but his loan was cut short just days later.

On 31 October 2012, Diogo agreed to a contract with Guarani, after having his federative rights assigned to Coimbra. The following 2 June, he moved to Coritiba.

On 14 July 2014, Diogo was loaned to Atlético Goianiense until the end of the year. On 8 January of the following year, he joined Goiás.

On 29 December 2015, Diogo agreed to a one-year deal with Botafogo. He scored his first goal in the first division on 16 July 2016, netting his team's first in a 3–3 home draw against Flamengo.

On 14 December 2016, after failing to agree new terms, Diogo signed a three-year contract with Cruzeiro.

On 14 November 2017, the sale of Diogo Barbosa to Palmeiras was settled for R$17.000.000.

On 11 September 2020, he was announced as a Grêmio player, signing a contract until 2023.

Career statistics

Honours

Club
Goiás
Campeonato Goiano: 2015

Cruzeiro
Copa do Brasil: 2017

Palmeiras
Campeonato Brasileiro Série A: 2018
Campeonato Paulista: 2020

Grêmio
Campeonato Gaúcho: 2021, 2022
Recopa Gaúcha: 2021, 2022

Individual
 Campeonato Carioca Team of the year: 2016

References

External links

1992 births
Living people
Sportspeople from Mato Grosso
Brazilian footballers
Association football defenders
Campeonato Brasileiro Série A players
Campeonato Brasileiro Série B players
Vila Nova Futebol Clube players
CR Vasco da Gama players
Sport Club do Recife players
Agremiação Sportiva Arapiraquense players
Guarani FC players
Coritiba Foot Ball Club players
Atlético Clube Goianiense players
Goiás Esporte Clube players
Botafogo de Futebol e Regatas players
Cruzeiro Esporte Clube players
Sociedade Esportiva Palmeiras players
Grêmio Foot-Ball Porto Alegrense players